Eucalyptus rameliana, commonly known as Ramel's mallee, is a species of low growing mallee that is endemic to desert areas of central Western Australia. It has smooth bark, broadly lance-shaped to egg-shaped adult leaves, flower buds arranged singly in leaf axils, pale yellow flowers and flattened, pyramid-shaped fruit.

Description
It has smooth greyish to brown bark. Flowering mainly occurs from May to June and the flowers are usually pale yellow, sometimes red.

Taxonomy
Eucalyptus rameliana was first formally described in 1876 by the botanist Ferdinand von Mueller his book, Fragmenta Phytographiae Australiae. The species was named in honour of Prospero Ramel who had introduced different species of Eucalypts into Algeria and southern France.

Distribution
Ramel's mallee is only known from the Little Sandy Desert south-east of Newman where it grows on sand dunes and swales.

Conservation status
This eucalypt is classified as "not threatened" by the Western Australian Government Department of Parks and Wildlife.

See also
List of Eucalyptus species

References

Eucalypts of Western Australia
rameliana
Myrtales of Australia
Plants described in 1876
Taxa named by Ferdinand von Mueller
Mallees (habit)